{{Infobox
| name             = 7News
| title            = 7NEWS
| image            = 
| label1           = Slogan
| data1            = “Know The News”
| label2           = Division of
| data2            = Seven Network
| label3           = Opening Theme
| data3            = The Mission by John Williams (1988–present)
| label4           = Founded
| data4            = 
| label5           = Headquarters
| data5            = National Administration (Head Office):Eveleigh, Sydney, AustraliaNational Operations Broadcast Centre:Docklands, Melbourne, Australia
| label6           = Area served
| data6            = Australia
| label7           = Formerly called
| data7            = Australian Television News (ATVN) (1963–1970) Seven National News (1970–1988) Seven Nightly News (1988–2000)
| label8           = Broadcast programs
| data8            = SunriseWeekend Sunrise7News Early Edition7News Morning Edition7News Afternoon Edition7News at 5  7News The Latest: 7News
| label9           = Parent
| data9            = Seven West Media
| label10          = Website
| data10           = 7news.com.au
| Picture Format   = 1080i (HDTV) downscaled to 576i for the SDTV feed.
}}7NEWS is the television news service of the Seven Network and, as of 2021, the highest-rating in Australia.

National bulletins are presented from Seven's high definition studios in Martin Place, Sydney, while flagship 6pm bulletins are produced in Sydney, Melbourne, Brisbane, Adelaide, and Perth city based studios. The network also produces local news bulletins and updates for the Gold Coast, as well as regional markets in Queensland, New South Wales (including the ACT), Victoria and Western Australia.

It draws upon the resources of ITN, NBC, Warner Bros. Discovery, CBC, CNN, APTN and Reuters for select international coverage. The network's Director of News and Current Affairs is Craig McPherson.

 History 7NEWS — previously known as ATVN News, Channel Seven News, Seven Eyewitness News, Seven National News, Seven Nightly News and Seven News — is one of Australia's longest-running television news services, founded in 1958, along with Nine News on the rival Nine Network.

In 2003, former Nine Network news and current affairs chief Peter Meakin was appointed to 7NEWS, tasked with lifting ratings in the struggling east coast markets by including more local content in those bulletins.7NEWS has been the top rating news service nationally for all but three years since 2005, partly attributed to the success of television game show Deal or No Deal (and later The Chase Australia), which provided the flagship 6pm bulletin with a significant lead-in audience.

In recent years, under the guidance of former longtime National Nine News chief Peter Meakin, Seven's news and current affairs division has produced more locally focused content, which has been lifting ratings for key markets such as Sydney and Melbourne. Since February 2005, the ratings of Deal or No Deal, 7NEWS and Today Tonight have gradually increased. 7NEWS was the highest-rating news service nationally in both the 2005 and 2006 ratings seasons. A key aspect of Seven's recent ratings dominance in news and current affairs has been attributed to Deal or No Deal's (and, since late 2015, The Chase Australia) top rating audience, which provides 7NEWS with a large lead-in audience. Between 2007 and 2010 inclusive, 7NEWS completed a clean sweep across the five capital cities in terms of being the most watched 6 pm news bulletin. On 5 July 2008, Channel Seven introduced a watermark on news and current affairs programmes.

In 2007, 7NEWS beat National Nine News and 10 News First in ratings for the first time in the Melbourne market. During the year, they ranked highest twenty weeks compared to Nine's nineteen weeks, while one week was tied. Previously, in 2006, Seven had ranked on top 16 weeks in while Nine had 24 weeks on top in Melbourne.

During 2008, from weeknight to weeknight, Seven and Nine had similar ratings, often changing the most popular show from night to night. As of 2013, Nine News retains a national lead, although Seven still has a tight grip on the Adelaide and Perth bulletins.
In November 2012, Peter Meakin resigned as director of news and current affairs of the Seven Network after nine years in the role, with Rob Raschke named as his successor.

In October 2013, it was announced that the Saturday 6pm bulletins would be extended to one hour, likely as a reaction to Nine News regaining its national lead in 2013.

On Monday 20 January 2014, the news theme was overhauled with the traditional The Mission piece removed after two decades, however, due to viewer backlash, The Mission was reinstated on Friday 24 January 2014.

In February 2014, Today Tonight was axed in the Sydney, Melbourne and Brisbane markets and the news bulletins were extended to one hour. The Adelaide and Perth bulletins remained at 30 minutes with Today Tonight being retained in only those two markets.

In 2015, 7NEWS suffered its worst ratings year for over a decade, with all three of its east coast bulletins, as well as its regional Queensland bulletins, languishing behind Nine News and its Adelaide bulletin also starting to lose to Nine on weeknights. However, Seven News soon reclaimed the lead nationally the following year, aided by the new game show lead-in The Chase Australia, which helped to increase numbers in Sydney and Melbourne, as well as a narrow 3,000 viewer loss to Nine in Brisbane.

In July 2016, a new locally focused bulletin for the Gold Coast was introduced, airing at 5.30pm every evening from the network's Surfers Paradise studios. The debut bulletin won its timeslot with 49,000, compared to the rival Nine Gold Coast News which drew 34,000 viewers. However, Nine still remained ahead of Seven overall in the Gold Coast market until 2019, when that newscast finally emerged as the top newscast there.

In November 2019, the Adelaide and Perth editions of Today Tonight were axed finally bringing their nightly news shows to an hour edition in line with the east coast. 

In 2023, Seven News will transition out of the Martin Place studios, with all operations transferred to Seven's facility in Eveleigh.

National bulletins

7NEWS Early Edition7NEWS Early Edition airs at 5am on weekdays and is presented by Jodie Speers, and includes news, business, finance, sport and weather. It airs from Seven's Martin Place studios. Fill in presenters include Edwina Bartholomew, Shaun White and Monique Wright. The bulletin is followed by Sunrise.

The bulletin first aired on 14 July 2008, presented by Simon Reeve, with sport presented by Mark Beretta. Reeve presented the first bulletin as Natalie Barr was hosting Sunrise at the time.

In January 2016, it was announced that Jodie Speers would replace Natalie Barr and Mark Beretta due to Sunrise starting at 5:30am. The bulletin also moved to the earlier time of 5am.

7NEWS Morning Edition7NEWS Morning Edition airs at 11.30 am on weekdays in three separate markets:
 The east coast edition is presented by Ann Sanders (Monday – Thursday) and Sally Bowrey (Friday) from Seven's Martin Place studios with sport presented by Abbey Gelmi (Monday), Matt Carmichael (Tuesday) and Matt Shirvington (Wednesday – Friday), and weather presented by meteorologist Tony Auden (Monday).
 The Adelaide edition is presented by Mike Smithson or Rosanna Mangiarelli, who both alternate in presenting the bulletin solo, with sport presented by Tom Wilson.
 The Perth edition is presented by rotating presenters from Seven Perth's Osborne Park studios.

Garry Wilkinson, Chris Reason and Chris Bath have previously presented the bulletin. In 2006, Bath and Sanders swapped roles with Bath appointed weekend presenter on 7NEWS Sydney and Sanders appointed presenter of 7NEWS Morning Edition.

Ryan Phelan was the initial sport presenter when a sport presenter was added to the bulletin. Jim Wilson started to present sport shortly after, and continued to present Tuesday – Friday sport until his resignation from the Seven Network in June 2020. Jacqueline Felgate presented Monday sport from June 2019 until March 2022, the role which was previously shared between Ryan Phelan and Matt Carmichael.

A weather presenter was added to the bulletin in 2014.

Fill in presenters for the bulletin include Angela Cox, Robert Ovadia, Chris Reason, Mike Amor (from Melbourne), Katrina Blowers, Kendall Gilding (from Brisbane) and Sally Bowrey (News), Matt Carmichael, Mel McLaughlin, Michelle Bishop and Ben Davis (Sport), Samantha Brett, Angie Asimus, Sally Bowrey and Amber Laidler (Weather).

7NEWS Updates
Short localised updates are presented during the afternoons by various state-based reporters and eventually presenters and evenings by the state-based presenters.

When breaking stories occur, newsflashes are presented from Seven's Martin Place studio or Seven Melbourne's national broadcast centre.

7NEWS at 57NEWS at 5 airs at 5pm every Saturday and Sunday and is presented by Sally Bowrey (Saturday) and Angie Asimus (Sunday), which includes news, sport, finance and weather. Sport is presented by Matt Shirvington (Saturday) and Mel McLaughlin (Sunday). It airs from Seven's Martin Place studios. The bulletin does not air on a Sunday in Melbourne, Adelaide and Perth during the AFL season. Seven's affiliate Seven Tasmania in Tasmania airs the bulletin on tape delay at 5:30pm right before the main bulletin at 6pm.

The bulletin first aired on 1 March 2015 as a 'Special Presentation' until it became permanent on 29 March 2015. Fill-in presenters include Mike Amor, Angela Cox, Sally Bowrey and Katrina Blowers.

The Latest: 7NEWSThe Latest: 7NEWS airs at or sometime after 10pm on Monday – Thursday and is presented by Angela Cox (Monday) and Michael Usher (Tuesday – Thursday) from Seven's Martin Place studios. As the title suggests, the late-night bulletin provides up-to-date information on the latest news of the day.

Previously known as 7NEWS Late Edition, it was presented by Chris Bath or Anne Fulwood from 1995 to 2003, with Natalie Barr filling in. The bulletin was cancelled in December 2003 due to declining ratings. Chris Bath was moved to 7NEWS Morning Edition (later 7NEWS Sydney) and Natalie Barr was moved to Sunrise.

Angela Cox, Chris Reason and Gemma Acton are the main fill-in presenters for the bulletin.

Capital-based bulletins

Afternoon news

National bulletin
Seven's national afternoon bulletin was introduced in 2003 as Target Iraq, during extensive coverage of the 2003 invasion of Iraq, and presented from Sydney by David Johnston. The program was retained after the initial invasion and moved production to Melbourne and was subsequently renamed the Seven 4.30 News. Johnston retired in September 2005 and was succeeded by Rebecca Maddern until production returned to Sydney in July 2006. Former US correspondent Mike Amor took over as anchor and the bulletin was relocated to the Martin Place Sydney studio. Amor was later replaced three months later by Samantha Armytage. On 3 December 2010, the bulletin was extended to 60 minutes and began to feature a sports bulletin. However, on 7 May 2012, the bulletin was truncated back to 30 minutes as The Price is Right returned to the 5:00 pm timeslot.

On 2 April 2012, a 30-minute Perth edition was launched, airing as a cutaway half-hour bulletin at 4:30pm, following the first half-hour of the national bulletin at 4pm. Regional and Remote Western Australia did not receive the 4.30 afternoon news on Seven Regional WA, rather, the network substituted it with its own local news service at 5:30pm.

In December 2012, the bulletin was renamed as 7NEWS Afternoon Edition. In January 2013, the bulletin returned to an hour due to the axing of The Price Is Right and returned to the Melbourne studio with Rebecca Maddern replacing Samantha Armytage.

However, in August 2013 Maddern was replaced by Melissa Doyle and Matt White and the bulletin expanded to start at 4pm.

In April 2014, Matt White resigned from the Seven Network to join Network Ten. The bulletin was presented solo by Melissa Doyle up until July 2015.

In June 2015, the Seven Network announced senior presenter Chris Bath's resignation and that Melissa Doyle would take over as 7NEWS Sydney weekend presenter from July.

The last incarnation of the national bulletin was broadcast from the network's Martin Place studios and was presented by Ann Sanders (Monday – Thursday) and Chris Reason (Friday). Sport was presented by Mel McLaughlin (Monday) and Jim Wilson (Tuesday – Friday) and weather was presented by David Brown (Monday – Thursday) and Amelia Mulcahy or Angie Asimus (Friday). The national edition simulcasted in Griffith through WIN Television's Seven Griffith, Tasmania through Seven Tasmania and South Australia through WIN Television SA and Seven GTS/BKN.

Local bulletins
Hour–long local afternoon bulletins were launched periodically in the capital cities, replacing the National bulletin in full. Melbourne and Brisbane launched local afternoon bulletins in August 2015. In July 2017, Adelaide launched their own local edition, while the half-hour Perth bulletin was extended to replace the national bulletin in full.

Presently, 7NEWS Afternoon Edition is aired at 4pm on weekdays in five separate local editions:
 The Sydney edition is broadcast from the network's Martin Place studios and is presented by Ann Sanders (Monday – Thursday) and Sally Bowrey (Friday). Sport is presented by Mel McLaughlin (Monday – Thursday) and Matt Shirvington (Friday) and weather is presented by Angie Asimus (Monday – Thursday) and Amber Laidler (Friday). Fill-in presenters include Angela Cox and Chris Reason (News) and Matt Shirvington (Sport). The local edition simulcasted across New South Wales and Australian Capital Territory through Seven-owned regional stations CBN and NEN, and in Griffith through WIN Television's Seven Griffith.
 The Melbourne edition is broadcast from the network's Docklands studios in Melbourne and is presented by Mike Amor and Rebecca Maddern (Monday), Mike Amor (Tuesday – Wednesday) and Rebecca Maddern (Thursday and Friday), with sport presented by Andrew McCormack, and weather presented by meteorologist Jane Bunn. Fill in presenters include Blake Johnson and Jayde Vincent (News), Abbey Gelmi, Andrew McCormack, Tom Browne and Nat Yoannidis (Sport) and Sonia Marinelli and Estelle Griepink (Weather). The local edition simulcasts across Victoria and New South Wales/South Australian border areas through Seven's AMV and PTV, as well as Tasmania through 7 Tasmania.
 The state-based Queensland edition is broadcast from the network's Mount Coot-tha studios in Brisbane and is presented by Kendall Gilding. Shane Webcke presents sport (Monday – Wednesday) and Ben Davis (Thursday and Friday) and meteorologist Tony Auden presenting the weather (Monday – Thursday) and Coastal Expert Paul Burt (Friday). Fill in presenters include Joel Dry (News), Marlina Whop (News), Max Futcher (News), Katrina Blowers (News), Samantha Heathwood (News), Amanda Abate (News), Ben Davis (Sport) and Laura Dymock (Weather). Initially launched as a separate 90-minute bulletin in the South East Queensland region (Brisbane and surrounding areas received by BTQ transmitters), it is now simulcast across the state via Seven Queensland and across central and remote areas of eastern Australia on Seven Central. It is also being aired in Darwin, Northern Territory through affiliate Seven Central (TND–34), where it broadcasts live into all relevant time zones, thus ending the bulletin at 4:30pm in Darwin. On the Gold Coast, the bulletin ends at 4:30 pm, due to the launch of the Gold Coast service on 4 July. On 10 August 2017, two years to the day since the bulletin launched, the local service claimed victory in the 4:00 pm timeslot, winning 21 weeks to the rival Nine Live Queensland’s two weeks.
The Adelaide edition is broadcast from the network's Hindmarsh studios in Adelaide and is presented by Rosanna Mangiarelli (Tuesday – Thursday) and Mike Smithson (Monday and Friday). Sport is presented by Theo Doropoulos or Andrew Hayes and weather is presented by Amelia Mulcahy. It is simulcast across South Australia through WIN Television SA and GTS/BKN. On 26 June 2020, the local Adelaide afternoon news formerly presented by Rosanna Mangiarelli was axed due to budget cuts, with that market receiving the Melbourne edition until 23 October. At the time, Adelaide received a local insert in the last segment of the bulletin, presented by a local state based presenter, and a localised weather update with Amelia Mulcahy. The bulletin was later reinstated on 26 October, but the axing affected Seven News in the Adelaide ratings, and helped rival Nine News to close the afternoon and evening news gap with Seven ever since.
 The Perth edition is broadcast from the network's Osborne Park studios in Perth and is presented by Samantha Jolly (Monday – Thursday) and Amelia Broun (Friday), who also present weather and sport is presented by Ryan Daniels. Unlike the former breakaway, the bulletin runs for a full hour. In regional WA, the bulletin ends at 4:30 pm, due to its weeknight regional bulletin at 5:30 pm.

Nightly news

Sydney7NEWS Sydney is presented by Mark Ferguson from Sunday to Thursday and Michael Usher and Angela Cox on Friday and Saturday from the Martin Place studios (until 2023, the studio will be moving to Eveleigh). Sport is presented by Mel McLaughlin from Sunday to Thursday and Matt Shirvington on Friday and Saturday. Weather is presented by Angie Asimus from Sunday to Thursday and Sally Bowrey on Friday and Saturday.

The Sydney bulletin is simulcast to Seven-owned regional transmitters in New South Wales and Australian Capital Territory, and to Griffith via WIN Television's Seven Griffith.

After decades of trailing Nine News Sydney and 10 News First Sydney in the ratings, which led to the sackings of Ross Symonds and Ann Sanders as the weeknight presenters in 2003, 7NEWS Sydney's attempts to boost ratings began in December with the appointment of Ian Ross as main weeknight anchor and the relocation of the bulletin, and other national bulletins, to new street-level studios in Martin Place in August 2004, thus allowing bystanders to watch bulletins being broadcast live. After two years of presenting the national morning news, Chris Bath returned to her former role as weekend news presenter in 2006, swapping roles with Ann Sanders. Ross presented his final bulletin for 7NEWS Sydney on Friday 27 November 2009. Bath took over as main weeknight presenter from Monday 30 November 2009 while former Nine News presenter Mark Ferguson took over as weekend presenter on Saturday 28 November 2009.Chris Bath to replace Ian Ross at Seven News , ebroadcast.com.au, 9 November 2009

The bulletin retained its ratings lead until 2011, when it lost to the rival Nine News bulletin for the first time in seven years.

In January 2014, Mark Ferguson was appointed weeknight presenter, replacing Chris Bath due to poor ratings. Bath became weekend presenter and continued to host Sunday Night until her resignation in July 2015, after which Melissa Doyle took over. More changes to Sydney's news presenting team in subsequent months saw former Melbourne weather presenter David Brown replace Sarah Cumming as the Sunday-Thursday weather presenter, Mel McLaughlin replace Jim Wilson as the Sunday-Thursday sports presenter and Wilson replace Ryan Phelan as the Friday-Saturday sports presenter.

In August 2016, it was announced that Michael Usher would replace Melissa Doyle as Friday and Saturday presenter. Doyle moved into a new expanded role as senior correspondent and host of Sunday Night.

In June 2020, Jim Wilson left Seven after 28 years with the network, to become a new host of 2GB's Drive program. His last sports bulletin was 27 June 2020. It was later announced that Matt Shirvington will replace him.

In November 2020, David Brown left the Sydney newsroom to return to Melbourne with Angie Asimus promoted to weeknights weather presenter.

In December 2020, it was announced Angela Cox would be joining Michael Usher as co-host of the weekend news bulletin from January 2021.

Fill-in presenters include Chris Reason, Angie Asimus and Ann Sanders (News), Matt Carmichael (Sport), and Sally Bowrey (Weather). Late night news updates are usually presented by either Samantha Brett or Susannah Carr from Perth.

Melbourne7NEWS Melbourne is directed by Shaun Menegola and presented by Peter Mitchell on weeknights and Mike Amor and Rebecca Maddern on weekends from Broadcast Centre Melbourne. Sport is presented by Tim Watson on weeknights and Andrew McCormack on weekends, replacing Abbey Gelmi who is on maternity leave. Weather is presented by Jane Bunn on weeknights and Sonia Marinelli on weekends.

Peter Mitchell previously held the role of weekend presenter for Seven Nightly News between 1987 and 2000 when he replaced the short-lived presenting duo of David Johnston and Anne Fulwood as weeknight presenter. Jennifer Keyte was appointed as weeknight presenter in 1990, becoming Australia's first solo female primetime commercial news presenter. In a network reshuffle in 1996, Keyte terminated her employment after the Seven Network attempted to pair her with David Johnston, who went to present solo for three years. She returned in 2003, assuming the role as weekend presenter, succeeding Jennifer Adams.

In May 2018, Network Ten announced that Jennifer Keyte would join the network to present Ten Eyewitness News Melbourne replacing Stephen Quartermain. In August 2018, it was announced that Mike Amor will move back to Australia after 17 years as United States Bureau Chief to replace Keyte.

Following decades of coming third in television ratings to Nine News Melbourne and 10 News First Melbourne (previously Ten Eyewitness News, Ten News at Five, Ten Evening News and Ten News: First at Five), 7NEWS Melbourne went into a tight contest to win the ratings battle in 2005. 7NEWS overtook the rival Nine bulletin in the ratings in 2007. This was subsequently followed by a series of advertisements and promos which have touted Seven News Melbourne as Melbourne's New #1 and Nine altering their promotions to simply say Melbourne's Best News - a throwback to the 1980s when National Nine News Melbourne was being beaten in the ratings by ATV-10's Ten Eyewitness News. As of 2011, Seven has lost its ratings lead at 6pm to 9pm.

In January 2022, it was announced that Rebecca Maddern will return to the Seven Network to present 7NEWS Melbourne on weekends with Mike Amor.

Until 2022, during the AFL season, Peter Mitchell and the weeknight team would present from Sunday to Thursday and Mike Amor, Rebecca Maddern and the weekend team would present on Friday and Saturday nights.

The bulletin is simulcast throughout regional Victoria and New South Wales/South Australia border areas that receive television services from Seven's AMV and PTV (with the NSW Border receiving a trimmed down 30-minute version of the full-hour news on weeknights), and to viewers in Darwin, Northern Territory through (TND-34). During the AFL season, the Saturday edition of 7NEWS Melbourne airs for only 30 minutes to fit in with the Seven Network's Saturday night AFL coverage.

Fill-in presenters include Blake Johnson and Jayde Vincent (News), Andrew McCormack, Tom Browne and Laura Spurway (Sport) and Estelle Griepink (Weather).

Brisbane7NEWS Brisbane is directed by Neil Warren and presented by Max Futcher and Sharyn Ghidella on weeknights and Katrina Blowers on weekends from Seven's Brisbane studios, located at Mount Coot-tha. Sport is presented by Shane Webcke from Sunday to Wednesday and Ben Davis from Thursday to Saturday. Weather is presented by certified meteorologist Tony Auden from Sunday to Thursday and Coastal Expert Paul Burt on Friday and Saturday.

The bulletin is also simulcast in Brisbane on local radio station 96.5 Family FM, and across central and remote areas of eastern Australia, on Southern Cross Central.  Regional Queensland viewers in the Sunshine Coast, Wide Bay-Burnett, Toowoomba, Rockhampton, Mackay, Townsville and Cairns television markets receive a trimmed down 30-minute version of the newshour on weeknights via Seven Queensland, with a live simulcast on weekends.

Previously, Tracey Challenor presented the weekend news for sixteen years until her resignation in February 2007. Cummins was first appointed to the weekday weather in 2005 after more than a year of the Brisbane bulletin not having a weather presenter; former kids show presenter Tony Johnston had this role in 2003. Cummins was replaced by former Nine weatherman John Schluter in early 2007 and she was moved to weekends. Ghidella joined Seven News in 2007 and replaced Challenor.

In October 2002, Rod Young moved from ABC News in Brisbane to co-anchor with Kay McGrath. She had presented 7NEWS Brisbane solo for the previous nine months following the retirement of Frank Warrick. Following a couple of lean years coming third to Nine News Brisbane and Ten Eyewitness News Brisbane, 7NEWS Brisbane regained its ratings lead by 2007, helped by the recruitment of ex-Nine weatherman John Schluter, former Today news presenter Sharyn Ghidella and director of news Rob Raschke. In 2008, 7NEWS Brisbane was officially the #1 bulletin in Brisbane, winning all 40 ratings weeks. As of 2013, Seven has lost its ratings lead at 6 pm to 9 pm.

In January 2013, Sharyn Ghidella and Bill McDonald were appointed Sunday to Thursday (later changed to weeknights) presenters with Kay McGrath and Rod Young moving to present on Friday and Saturday (later changed to weekends). It was also announced that Ghidella will present a local edition of Today Tonight, which was axed in January 2014 in favour of the bulletin's one hour extension.

In June 2016, it was announced that Rod Young would leave 7NEWS Brisbane to present a new local bulletin for 7NEWS Gold Coast.

In March 2018, McDonald was removed as co-anchor of the bulletin, and was replaced by Max Futcher following poor ratings.

In December 2019, Kay McGrath announced her retirement after 40 years in television and will present her final bulletin on 26 January. Katrina Blowers has been announced as her replacement.

In January 2023, Pat Welsh announced his resignation effective 28 January 2023 as sport presenter after 47 years with the Seven Network, and Ben Davis was announced as his replacement presenting Sport on Thursday through Saturday. 

News updates for Brisbane are presented by Max Futcher or Sharyn Ghidella throughout the afternoon and the early evening. Samantha Heathwood, Katrina Blowers and Kendall Gilding are fill-in news presenters for the bulletin. Ben Davis, Katie Brown, and Alissa Smith are fill-in sports presenters and Liz Cantor, Georgie Chumbley, and Laura Dymock are the fill-in weather presenters.

Adelaide7NEWS Adelaide is directed by Chris Salter and presented by Will Goodings and Rosanna Mangiarelli on weeknights, and Mike Smithson on weekends from Seven's studios located at Hindmarsh. Sport is presented by Mark Soderstrom on weeknights and Bruce Abernethy on weekends. Weather is presented by Amelia Mulcahy on weeknights and Gertie Spurling on weekends.

The Adelaide bulletin is simulcast to the regional areas of South Australia on Southern Cross Television GTS/BKN in the Spencer Gulf region and Broken Hill in New South Wales, and through WIN South Australia in the Riverland and Mount Gambier/South East regions of the state.

From 1989 to 2004 Graeme Goodings presented 7NEWS Adelaide on weeknights with Doyle until he was diagnosed with bowel cancer. Goodings and Riddell, the then weekend news presenter, agreed to swap roles, allowing for Goodings' rehabilitation. Goodings left 7NEWS Adelaide in December 2014, after 34 years reading Adelaide's news.

Prior to 27 December 1987, the presenters and production crew of 7NEWS Adelaide produced Ten News Adelaide (then known as Ten Eyewitness News). However, as the television industry was consolidating in Australia, these news services had each become associated by ownership with inter-state news services being broadcast on opposite frequencies; therefore, to simplify network interaction, their respective networks agreed to swap channel assignments and network affiliations in Adelaide.

In December 2007, production of 7NEWS moved from studios located at Gilberton to a new purpose-built space at Hindmarsh.

During the AFL season, Seven News Adelaide does not air at the regular time on Saturday or Sunday if there is a twilight match involving Adelaide and/or Port Adelaide, in which case, a shortened edition is broadcast at half time, replacing analysis of the AFL matches broadcast, or a full bulletin is broadcast immediately after the game.

In 2014, 7NEWS Adelaide won every single ratings weeknight against the rival Nine News Adelaide, but in 2015 started to lose some nights to Nine as Seven News as a whole suffered its worst ratings figures for over a decade. It clocked up 500 consecutive weekly ratings wins in March 2019, extending a streak which started in August 2006.

In August 2019, Jane Doyle celebrated 30 years of reading the news on Seven.

In November 2019, John Riddell announced his retirement and presented his last bulletin on 6 December. Doyle became solo presenter after Ridell's retirement.

In June 2020, it was announced that Jessica Adamson and Tim Noonan were made redundant. The weekday 4pm bulletin was also retired with Melbourne's bulletin broadcast to the Adelaide market. Rosanna Mangiarelli replaced Adamson on weekends. The bulletin was later reinstated on 26 October, but the axing affected Seven News in the Adelaide ratings, and helped rival Nine News to close the afternoon and evening news gap with Seven ever since.

In September 2022, it was announced that FIVEAA's Will Goodings will replace Mike Smithson to co-host weekends.

In November 2022, it was announced that Jane Doyle would retire from television after more than three decades presenting 7NEWS Adelaide. Will Goodings and Rosanna Mangiarelli were announced as her replacement, commencing from January 2023.

Fill-in presenters include Mike Smithson, Andrea Nicolas, Elspeth Hussey, and Mark Mooney (News), Theo Doropoulos and Andrew Hayes (Sport) and Gertie Spurling and Casey Treloar (Weather). News updates are presented by presenters or fill-in presenters.

Seven remains South Australia's number one Adelaide news service for more than a decade.

Perth7NEWS Perth is presented by Rick Ardon and Susannah Carr on weeknights and Angela Tsun and Tim McMillan on weekends from Seven and West Australian Newspaper studios located at Osborne Park. Sport is presented by Ryan Daniels on weeknights and Adrian Barich on weekends. Weather is presented by Samantha Jolly. Seven News Perth is also simulcast to Seven-owned transmitter across regional and remote areas of Western Australia, and Curtin FM 100.1 in the Perth CBD area, but as of 2016, the simulcast on radio had a broadcasting break.

Long standing 7NEWS Perth presenter Jeff Newman announced his retirement from television on 1 July 2009, and retired from his role on Monday 10 August 2009. He was replaced by former Nine News Perth weather presenter Natalia Cooper, who began her new role during September 2009. Cooper resigned from Seven Perth at the end of 2012 with ex-Nine weather presenter Angela Tsun taking over as her replacement for the 4:30pm news and 6pm weather forecasts.

In 2015, Rick Ardon and Susannah Carr celebrated a thirty-year anniversary as a news reading duo. They are one of the longest serving dual news presenter teams in the world and the dual-presenter format used by 7NEWS Perth has been highly successful. In contrast to previous struggles seen in Sydney and Melbourne in the late 1990s, 7NEWS Perth has led in the ratings for decades, well ahead of 10 News First Perth and Nine News Perth by as many as 100,000 viewers.

In February 2020, the Seven Network announced that Tim McMillan would join Angela Tsun to present on weekends.

In February 2022, Basil Zempilas left his nightly sport duties due to other commitments and being the Lord Mayor of Perth. Basil will still be part of the Seven Network's sport coverage.

News updates for Perth are presented by Angela Tsun, Susannah Carr or Rick Ardon throughout the afternoon and by Susannah Carr or Rick Ardon in the early evening. Yvette Mooney was the weekend news presenter until she was diagnosed with breast cancer in 2007 and subsequently left the network in June 2008. Before the move to the Osborne Park Studios in Feb 2015, Blake Johnson and Samantha Jolly alternated fortnightly presenting for both Weekend bulletins. Fill-in presenters include Syan Vallance, Tina Altieri, Elle Georgiou, Amelia Broun, Samantha Jolly (News) and Anna Hay (Sport).

Regional bulletins

Regional Queensland
Local news bulletins for Regional Queensland are broadcast each weeknight at 6pm, in all seven regional areas: Cairns, Townsville, Mackay, Wide Bay, Toowoomba, the Sunshine Coast, and Rockhampton. They are followed by a shortened 30-minute version of 7NEWS Brisbane.

The bulletins are presented by Rob Brough, with Joanne Desmond co-anchoring the Cairns, Townsville, Rockhampton and Toowoomba editions. Sport is presented by Nathan Spurling and weather is presented by Livio Regano. Fill-in presenters include Dannielle DiPinto (news), Luke McGarry (sport), Rosanna Natoli (weather).

Reporters and camera crews are based at newsrooms in each of the seven regions with studio presentation for the Cairns, Townsville, Mackay, Darling Downs, Rockhampton and Wide Bay bulletins pre-recorded at studios in Maroochydore. The Sunshine Coast edition of Seven News is broadcast live, but may also exchange it to any of the six pre-recorded regions at certain circumstances (e.g., cyclone coverage in the nearest region of immediate concern). News editing is undertaken by the local newsrooms, and sent to the main Maroochydore studios for transmission.

The most successful edition of 7NEWS Queensland is broadcast on the Sunshine Coast. In early 1998, WIN Television launched a competing service publicly stating that it would beat Seven in the ratings within six months. At the end of the 1998 ratings season, after a new station head (Laurie Patton) had overseen a comprehensive re-vamping of the program and its external promotions, 7NEWS Queensland had actually increased its audience share by six ratings points.

In early 2004, 7NEWS Queensland was re-introduced in the Townsville and Cairns sub-markets as a result of regulations regarding local content on regional television introduced by the Australian Broadcasting Authority.

On 5 March 2007, 7NEWS Queensland bulletins commenced production and broadcasts in a widescreen standard-definition digital format. 7NEWS Queensland was the first regional news service in regional Queensland to convert to widescreen.

On 22 November 2010, 7NEWS Queensland launched a sixth edition for the Rockhampton/Gladstone and Central Queensland region.

On 2 November 2015, 7NEWS Queensland launched a seventh edition for the Toowoomba and the Darling Downs region. With the said launch, Seven News became the only news service to cover all regional centres of Queensland since the axing of WIN News in the Mackay region in May 2015. This lasted until July 2017, when rival Nine News began to roll out local composite bulletins for their statewide affiliate Southern Cross Television (which carried Nine programming from July 2016 until July 2021).

From 11 July 2016, these editions are consolidated with the 7NEWS branding, though the openers of these editions remained to address as 7NEWS Queensland, (previously known as Seven Local News). The Local News branding was completely phased out on 5 September 2016 in favour of the 7NEWS brand.

Formerly, there were two bureaus located in Hervey Bay and Gladstone covering their respective regions, but they were closed due to budget reasons.

Gold Coast7NEWS Gold Coast is presented by Amanda Abate and Steve Titmus. Sport is presented by Sally Pearson and weather is presented by meteorologist Tony Auden (Monday) and Coastal Expert Paul Burt (Tuesday - Friday), and coastal, beaches and fishing reports from Paul on a Thursday and Friday.

The bulletin airs on weeknights at 5.30pm on BTQ-7's Gold Coast relay transmitters, ahead of the main 6pm news from Brisbane, placing it in direct competition with rival Nine Gold Coast News. The bulletin does not air when Australian Test cricket matches are scheduled.

On 4 July 2016, a new local bulletin for the Gold Coast was introduced, produced and broadcast live from Seven's Surfers Paradise studio.

From its launch, weekend bulletins were also produced, which made Seven the only network to produce local Gold Coast bulletins seven days a week. However, weekend bulletins were axed in November 2017, citing cost-cutting measures. In February 2018, Amanda (who formerly presented the axed weekend edition) joined Rod in presenting the weeknight local bulletin as well as reading sport.

In July 2019, after three years on air, 7NEWS Gold Coast officially became the number one news bulletin on the Gold Coast, winning twenty-one weeks to the rival Nine Gold Coast News' one week.

Rod Young formerly presented the bulletin from its launch in July 2016, before retiring from television news on 22 July 2021.

In February 2022, Sally Pearson was appointed sport presenter for the bulletin.

Fill in presenters include Bianca Stone (news), and Liz Cantor and Tamra Bow (weather).

Regional New South Wales
Local news bulletins for Regional New South Wales are broadcast each weeknight at 6pm, in five regional areas: Albury and the Border, Wagga Wagga and the Riverina, Central West (Dubbo and Orange), the North Coast (Coffs Harbour and Taree) and Northern Rivers (Lismore), and Tamworth and the New England. They are followed by a 30-minute complementary bulletin named 7NEWS at 6:30, which is a half-hour statewide bulletin with Daniel Gibson carrying all national and international stories usually seen in metropolitan markets. Albury does not receive this bulletin, instead showing a shortened 30-minute edition of Melbourne's 6pm news, as the New South Wales-Victoria border (which Albury is located) leans closer to Melbourne than it is to Sydney.

The local bulletins are presented by Nick Hose and Madelaine Collignon. Sport is presented by Stephen Murphy and weather is presented by Kirstie Fitzpatrick. Fill-in presenters include Kirstie Fitzpatrick (with Daniel Gibson presenting the Border & North East bulletin) (news) and Pip Waller and Craig Moore (weather).

Reporters and camera crews are based at newsrooms in each of the five regions with studio presentation for the Border, Central West, Riverina and the New England regions pre-recorded at Seven's regional studio in Canberra. The North Coast edition of is presented live, also from Canberra. News editing is undertaken by the local newsrooms, and reports are sent to the main Canberra studios for transmission.

Regional Western Australia
A bulletin for regional Western Australia is broadcast each weeknight at 5:30pm. It is followed by 7NEWS Perth.

The bulletin is presented from Seven's regional WA newsroom in Bunbury by Noel Brunning (news and sport). Until October 2022, the weather segment was presented by Shauna Willis. Since her departure, reporters Adelaide Williams & Amanda Sabatino have presented the weather. No permanent replacement has been announced.

Reporters and camera crews are based at newsrooms across regional and remote areas of the state. Previously, under the former Golden West Network branding, transmission came from Bunbury's former Roberts Cres studios; since 2018, master control shifted to Canberra, years after Prime Media Group (which Seven West Media later bought in 2021) bought GWN, with local presentation moved to a new Bunbury newsroom facility. News editing is undertaken by local newsrooms, with studio presentation and reports sent to Canberra for transmission via satellite and microwave.

Current affairs

SunriseSunrise is the network's breakfast program, aired weekdays from 5:30am to 9am. The show is broadcast live from Seven's Martin Place studios, and is based on a mix of human interest, showbiz and entertainment alongside half-hourly national news and sport bulletins and weather updates (WA viewers regularly receive a locally produced bulletin in place of the national bulletin).

The program is hosted by David Koch and Natalie Barr with news presenter Edwina Bartholomew, sport presenter Mark Beretta and weather presenter Sam Mac.

Weekend SunriseWeekend Sunrise is the weekend edition of Sunrise, aired Saturday and Sunday mornings from 7am to 10am. The show is formatted much like its weekday counterpart, broadcast live from Seven's Martin Place studios, and is based on a mix of human interest, showbiz and entertainment alongside half-hourly national news and sport bulletins and weather updates.

The program is hosted by Monique Wright and Matt Doran with Sally Bowrey as news and sport presenter and James Tobin as weather presenter.

Former shows

7NEWS at 77NEWS at 7 aired at 7pm on weeknights and was presented by Melissa Doyle from Seven's Martin Place studios, with weather presented by David Brown from the Melbourne studio. The bulletin aired on the Seven Network's secondary channel, 7Two across Australia and it first aired on 5 August 2013 and was first presented by Mark Ferguson, with Doyle taking over a week later.

Western Australia had its own local live version of 7NEWS at 7, also presented from the Martin Place studio in Sydney by Sally Bowrey with weather presented by Angela Tsun from the Perth studio.

On 28 April 2014, the bulletin was removed from the schedule.

Today TonightToday Tonight was the network's tabloid current affairs program, which aired on weeknights at 6:30pm following the 6pm news bulletins. Local editions were produced in Brisbane, Sydney and Melbourne before being cancelled in 2014 with their respective news bulletins expanded from thirty minutes to one hour. In November 2019, the Adelaide and Perth editions were cancelled, with 7NEWS in those markets expanded to a full hour, bringing them in line with the east coast.

Sunday NightSunday Night was the network's current affairs and investigative journalism program, which aired on Sunday nights at 8:30pm and presented by Melissa Doyle.

Controversy
American police attack
In June 2020, a 7NEWS crew were in Washington DC, United States conducting a live broadcast of the Black Lives Matter protests for Sunrise.

During the broadcast American police officers charged at the crew, battering them with clubs and riot shields, and punching the cameraman Tim Myers in the face. The incident prompted comment from Prime Minister Scott Morrison and Opposition Leader Anthony Albanese. Later, the reporter Amelia Brace testified in front of US Congress regarding the incident.

Outing of David Campbell

The news service, and in particular its news director Peter Meakin and reporter Adam Walters, came under heavy criticism in 2010 for the decision to air a story on then-New South Wales Transport Minister David Campbell as homosexual. Campbell, a Member of the New South Wales Legislative Assembly for over two decades, was forced to resign after Meakin chose to air a story by Walters showing Campbell leaving a gay bathhouse.
Amidst criticism of the story former NSW Labor Premier Barrie Unsworth condemned Campbell's actions.

"Campbell has been the police minister and he's been on the state crime commission, and he's frequented places where he's easily recognised," Mr Unsworth told The Australian newspaper.

"The threat is not from Channel 7 lurking outside but by the people inside. We've got a criminal milieu in this city and he laid himself open to all sorts of threats and blackmail."

Seven's decision to run the story was derided by other politicians and several rival media outlets as "not a good moment for the media coverage of Macquarie Street", "old-fashioned" and an act of "pathetic snooping".

Seven's justification for airing the story was initially that Campbell had misused his Ministerial vehicle, however this allegation was quickly shown to be untrue by other media outlets, as New South Wales Ministers have full private use of their Ministerial vehicles. The justification later put forward by Seven to defend its actions was that it was in the public interest to make the allegations public because of the risk of blackmail.

The Australian Communications & Media Authority instigated an investigation into Seven's conduct in this matter, under the industry's self-regulated code of conduct. It accepted the public interest justification put forward by Seven, that Campbell's actions left him "vulnerable to compromise or blackmail".

Tony Abbott "Shit happens"
In 2011, under the freedom of information laws, 7NEWS obtained footage showing Opposition leader Tony Abbott speaking about the recent death of an Australian soldier in Afghanistan. 7NEWS edited the clips, then broadcast them that evening. After the incident, many media websites labeled the story a "ratings grab" for the network.

The following morning, rival networks, obtained the same footage as 7NEWS and broadcast another part of the interview not seen on the original report showing military leaders agreeing with Tony saying "It certainly does", backing his claims that his words had been taken out of context. Mr Abbott maintains that he was discussing whether the unit had had sufficient firepower support during the incident. 7NEWS reporter Mark Riley appeared on Sunrise'' and many other radio shows defending the claims and the report that aired.

See also
Journalism in Australia

References

External links
7NEWS website
7NEWS Sydney on 7plus
7NEWS Melbourne on 7plus
7NEWS Brisbane on 7plus
7NEWS Adelaide on 7plus
7NEWS Perth on 7plus
7NEWS Gold Coast on 7plus
7NEWS Local News on 7plus
7NEWS Morning Edition on 7plus
Sunrise on 7plus

 
Seven Network
Martin Place